Autigny may refer to the following places:

 Autigny, Switzerland, a commune in the canton of Fribourg, Switzerland
 Autigny, Seine-Maritime, a commune in the Seine-Maritime department, France